North Levantine Arabic is a subdivision of Levantine Arabic. It is also known as Syro-Lebanese Arabic, though that term is sometimes used to mean all of Levantine Arabic.

It stems from the north in Turkey, specifically in the coastal regions of the Adana, Hatay, and Mersin provinces, to Lebanon, passing through the Mediterranean coastal regions of Syria (the Latakia and Tartus governorates) as well as the areas surrounding Aleppo and Damascus.

With over  million speakers worldwide as of 2022, North Levantine Arabic is used for daily speech mainly in Lebanon and Syria, while most of the written and official documents and media use Modern Standard Arabic.

Dialects 
 Syrian Arabic: The dialect of Damascus and the dialect of Aleppo are well-known.
 Lebanese Arabic: North Lebanese, South Lebanese (Metuali, Shii), North-Central Lebanese (Mount Lebanon Arabic), South-Central Lebanese (Druze Arabic), Standard Lebanese, Beqaa, Sunni Beiruti, Saida Sunni, Iqlim-Al-Kharrub Sunni, Jdaideh
 Çukurova, Turkey: Cilician/Çukurovan

References